This is a list of the 994 blue plaques placed by English Heritage and its predecessors in the boroughs of London, the City of Westminster, and the City of London. The scheme includes a small number of plaques that were erected privately and subsequently absorbed. 

The scheme began in 1876. It was originally administered by the Royal Society of Arts until 1901 when it was taken over the London County Council. The LCC ran the scheme until its abolition in 1965 when its successor body the Greater London Council (GLC) took charge. With the abolition of the GLC in 1986, the blue plaque scheme has been administered by English Heritage.

By borough

Barking and Dagenham 
There is a single blue plaque in the London Borough of Barking and Dagenham.

|}

Barnet 
There are 19 blue plaques in the London Borough of Barnet.

|}

Bexley 
There are two blue plaques in the London Borough of Bexley.

|}

Brent 
There are two blue plaques in the London Borough of Brent.

|}

Bromley 
There are seven blue plaques in the London Borough of Bromley.

Camden 

There are 176 blue plaques in the London Borough of Camden.

Croydon 
There are eleven blue plaques in the London Borough of Croydon.

Ealing 
There are six blue plaques in the London Borough of Ealing.

Enfield 
There are four blue plaques in the London Borough of Enfield.

|}

Greenwich 
There are 16 blue plaques in the Royal Borough of Greenwich.

Hackney 
There are eight blue plaques in the London Borough of Hackney.

Hammersmith and Fulham 
There are 24 blue plaques in the London Borough of Hammersmith and Fulham.

Haringey 
There are ten blue plaques in the London Borough of Haringey.

Harrow 
There are four blue plaques in the London Borough of Harrow.

|}

Hounslow 
There are ten blue plaques in the London Borough of Hounslow.

|}

Islington 
There are 19 blue plaques in the London Borough of Islington.

Kensington and Chelsea 

There are 188 blue plaques in the Royal Borough of Kensington and Chelsea.

Kingston upon Thames 
There are five blue plaques in the Royal Borough of Kingston upon Thames.

|}

Lambeth 
There are 27 blue plaques in the London Borough of Lambeth.

Lewisham 
There are thirteen blue plaques in the London Borough of Lewisham.

|}

Merton 
There are eleven blue plaques in the London Borough of Merton.

|}

Newham 
There are two blue plaques in the London Borough of Newham.

|}

Redbridge 
There are three blue plaques in the London Borough of Redbridge.

|}

Richmond upon Thames 
There are twenty six blue plaques in the London Borough of Richmond upon Thames.

Southwark 
There are 20 blue plaques in the London Borough of Southwark.

Sutton 
There is a single blue plaque in the London Borough of Sutton.

|}

Tower Hamlets 
There are 22 blue plaques in the London Borough of Tower Hamlets.

Waltham Forest 
There are four blue plaques in the London Borough of Waltham Forest .  

|}

Wandsworth 
There are twenty eight blue plaques in the London Borough of Wandsworth.

City of London 
There is a single blue plaque in the City of London.

|}

City of Westminster 

There are 320 blue plaques in the City of Westminster.

See also
 List of blue plaques

References

External links
English Heritage plaques recorded on openplaques.org
English Heritage  – Blue plaques
English Heritage – Search blue plaques
London has 933 blue plaques plotted on this new interactive map — find out who's lived near you Interactive map by Esri April 2018

London
English Heritage
Lists of buildings and structures in London
Lists of places in London
Lists of public art by London borough